The Sustainable Initiative (Hi) is a political party in Åland.

History
Sustainable Initiative was officially formed as a political party in June 2019 ahead of that year's elections. Prior, it had been an unregistered political movement.

The party received 8.3% of the vote in those elections, winning two of the 30 seats in Parliament, and improving their result from the 2015 elections by over 7 percentage points. In the municipal election the party won in total of four seats: two in Mariehamn, one in Lemland and one in Hammarland.

It is a member party of the Centre Group of the Nordic Council.

References

External links
Official website

Political parties in Åland
Green parties in Europe
Political parties established in 2019